The 2019 Nigerian House of Representatives elections in Gombe State was held on February 23, 2019, to elect members of the House of Representatives to represent Gombe State, Nigeria.

Overview

Summary

Results

Akko
A total of 11 candidates registered with the Independent National Electoral Commission to contest in the election. APC candidate Bello Usman A Kumo won the election, defeating Ahmad Aishatu of PDP and  other party candidates.

Balanga/Billiri
A total of 12 candidates registered with the Independent National Electoral Commission to contest in the election. APC candidate Mela Victor won the election, defeating Isa Ali of PDP and  other party candidates.

Dukku/Nafada
A total of 3 candidates registered with the Independent National Electoral Commission to contest in the election. APC candidate Aishatu Jibril Dukku won the election, defeating Saidu Adamu Jodoma of PDP and Shehu Tukur Alkali of NNPP.

Gombe/kwami/Funakaye
A total of 16 candidates registered with the Independent National Electoral Commission to contest in the election. APC candidate Bauchi Yaya Tango won the election, defeating Abubakar Shehu Durbi of PDP and  other party candidates.

Kaltungo/Shongom
A total of 9 candidates registered with the Independent National Electoral Commission to contest in the election. APC candidate Karu Simon Elisha won the election, defeating Kalba Gora Adamu of PDP and  other party candidates.

Yamaltu/Deba
A total of 9 candidates registered with the Independent National Electoral Commission to contest in the election. APC candidate Abubakar Yunusa Ahmed won the election, defeating Garba Inuwa of PDP and  other party candidates.

References 

House of Representatives
Gombe
Gombe State House of Representatives elections